The Congress Working Committee (CWC) is the executive committee of the Indian National Congress. It was formed in December 1920 at Nagpur session of INC which was headed by C. Vijayaraghavachariar. It typically consists of fifteen members elected from the All India Congress Committee. It is headed by the Working President.

The Working Committee has had different levels of power in the party at different times. In the period prior to Indian independence in 1947, the Working Committee was the centre of power, and the Working President was frequently more active than the Congress President. In the period after 1967, when the Congress Party split for the first time (between factions loyal to Indira Gandhi and those led by the Syndicate of regional leaders including Kamaraj, Prafulla Chandra Sen, Ajoy Mukherjee, and Morarji Desai), the power of the Working Committee declined; but Indira Gandhi's triumph in 1971 led to a re-centralisation of power away from the states and the All-India Congress Committee and caused the Working Committee in Delhi to once again be the paramount decision-making body of the party. The centralised nature of Congress decision making has since caused observers in the states to informally describe instructions from Delhi as coming from the "High Command".

Composition of Steering Committeehttps://news.abplive.com/news/india/congress-to-hold-first-meeting-of-steering-committee-on-sunday-1567262 

President 

Members

Permanent Invitees

Special Invitees

Criticism

The Congress has not held internal elections to CWC for nearly 20 years and last elections were held in 1998. In 2017 Election Commission ordered it to hold internal elections but as of 2020 no elections were held. When Congress was trying to forge an alliance with ideologically opposite Shiv Sena in Maharashtra in 2019, Congress leader Sanjay Nirupam publicly urged Sonia Gandhi to dissolve the CWC, saying "they cannot be trusted anymore."
 A paper by Observer Research Foundation calls a large number of CWC members "unprincipled, opportunists and self-serving individuals for whom self-interest is paramount."

See also
 Indian National Congress
 All India Congress Committee
 Pradesh Congress Committee

References

External links
 Official All India Congress Committee website
 Official Indian National Congress website

Indian National Congress
Executive committees of political parties